The River Mite is a river in the county of Cumbria in northern England.

The valley through which the river Mite runs is called Miterdale. The name Mite is thought to be of British origin and related to a root such as 'meigh': to urinate or dribble, possibly a wry reflection of the relatively minor nature of the Mite.

The Mite rises on Tongue Moor, immediately below the peak of Illgill Head to the north west, at an altitude of around  After coalescing into a stream, the upper Mite runs over the waterfalls of Miterdale Head and descends into the narrow but steep-sided upper Miterdale valley. It then flows to the south west, past the Bakerstead outdoor pursuit centre, the village Eskdale Green, to the north of Muncaster Fell, and Muncaster Mill. Finally, the River Mite meets the River Esk and River Irt at the estuarine confluence of the three, near the ancient village of Ravenglass on the Cumbrian coast.

The river runs parallel to the Ravenglass and Eskdale steam railway, and one of their locomotives is named after it. Upper Miterdale formed one of the archetypes upon which Arthur Ransome based the valley of Swallowdale in the eponymous volume of Swallows and Amazons series of stories.

Tributaries
Robin Gill
Black Gill
Merebeck Gill
Mere Beck
Gill Beck

References

Mite, River
1Mite